Sweet and Low was an Australian television series which aired in 1959 on ABC station ABV-2 in Melbourne (with kinescope recordings being shown in Sydney on ANB-2 during 1960). Hosted by Bob Walters, the half-hour series presented performances by jazz musicians. Bruce Clarke appeared as a guest in the second episode.

Competition in the 9:00PM time-slot consisted of American imports, The Loretta Young Show on GTV-9 and Whitehall Playhouse (which consisted of selections from several US anthology series such as Studio 57) on HSV-7. It was preceded on ABV-2's schedule by U.S. drama series The Adventures of Falcon and followed by Australian-produced discussion show Come In on This.

There is no information as to whether any recordings (such as kinescopes) still exist of the series, raising the possibility it may be lost, though exact information is unavailable.

References

External links
Sweet and Low at IMDb

1959 Australian television series debuts
1959 Australian television series endings
Australian music television series
Australian Broadcasting Corporation original programming
Black-and-white Australian television shows
English-language television shows